Life is the eighth studio album and the third English album recorded by Puerto Rican performer Ricky Martin. It was released by Columbia Records on October 10, 2005 in Europe, October 11, 2005 in the US and October 19, 2005 in Japan.

Background and development
Martin co-wrote most of the songs on Life. He said that this album is one of his most personal releases to date, explaining, "I was really in touch with my emotions. I think this album is very multi-layered, just like life is. It's about feeling anger. It's about feeling joy. It's about feeling uncertainty. It's about feeling. And all my emotions are part of this production". The album was recorded in the United States and Egypt.

Commercial performance
The album has sold 694,000 copies worldwide.

Life debuted at number six on the Billboard 200 with nearly 73,000 copies sold. In total, the album has sold 274,000 copies in the United States, according to Nielsen SoundScan.

Life also reached the top ten in Argentina and Spain. In the United Kingdom it peaked at number forty. The album was later certified Gold in Argentina and Mexico.

The first single, "I Don't Care" peaked at number sixty-five on the Billboard Hot 100, and reached number three on the Hot Dance Club Songs. The Spanish-language version, called "Qué Más Da" peaked at number seven on the Hot Latin Songs. "I Don't Care" reached also top ten in Italy and Finland. In the United Kingdom, it peaked at number eleven.

The second international single, "It's Alright" became a hit in France, after it was re-recorded as duet with M. Pokora. It peaked at number four and was certified Silver.

Track listing

Notes
 signifies a co-producer
 signifies a vocal producer
 signifies a background vocal producer
 signifies a remix producer

Charts

Certifications and sales

Release history

References

2005 albums
Ricky Martin albums
Columbia Records albums
Albums produced by Scott Storch
Albums produced by Sean Garrett
Albums produced by the Matrix (production team)
Albums produced by Luny Tunes